Pulinchode is a place in Engandiyoor village located in the Thrissur district of Kerala state, India. This Place shares borders with Chetuva on the north side and Chantha on the south side. On the west side is the Anjam Kallu and to the east Canoli Canal. The native languages of Pulinchode are Malayalam & English. Most of the people use the Malayalam language for communication.

Pulinchode is dependent on Persian Gulf countries for income.

Arts & sports clubs 
There are various arts & sports clubs in the area, such as the Pulinchode Youth Club, Vallabhatta Engandiyoor, BLS Engandiyoor, Sardar Pulikkakadav, GSS Engandiyoor, and NASC Engandiyoor.

Religious organizations 
Religious organizations include:

 Pulinchode Centre Ulsava Committee
 Pulinchode Vadakku Bagam Ulsava Committee
 Pulinchode Padinjaru bagam Ulsava Committee
 Pulinchode Kizhakkumury Ulasava Committee
 Saint Sebastian Vadakkumury Samudhayam

The famous St Mary's Lourdes Church is located in this place.

Youth organizations

 ലൂർദ് വോയിസ്‌ (Lourde Nagar-Pulinchode)
 Youth Wing Pulinchode

Transportation to Pulinchode 

Nearest airport: Cochin International Airport, Kochi - 67 km
Nearest railway station: Thrissur - 29 km
Next closest railway station: Guruvayoor 7 km by road

See also
Lourde Nagar-Pulinchode

References

Villages in Thrissur district